John Junior Igbarumah (born 13 February 1992) is a Nigerian footballer who plays for Swedish club Sandviken.

References

1992 births
Living people
Nigerian footballers
Nigerian expatriate footballers
Association football wingers
Syrianska IF Kerburan players
Sandvikens IF players
Carlstad United BK players
IK Sirius Fotboll players
Dalkurd FF players
Allsvenskan players
Superettan players
Ettan Fotboll players
Expatriate footballers in Sweden
Nigerian expatriate sportspeople in Sweden